Les Ogres is a 2015 French comedy-drama film directed by Léa Fehner and written by Fehner, Catherine Paillé and Brigitte Sy.

Plot 
The film centres around the life of a travelling theatre company. The members, free and eccentric, develop a bond through their passion for theatre. But the imminent arrival of a baby and the return of a former lover will reopen the old wounds of the past.

Cast 
 Adèle Haenel as Mona
 Marc Barbé as Monsieur Déloyal
 Lola Dueñas as Lola
 François Fehner as François
 Inès Fehner as Inès
 Marion Bouvarel as Marion
 Patrick d'Assumçao as Marion's lover
 Philippe Cataix as Chignol

Accolades

References

External links 
 

2015 films
2015 comedy-drama films
2010s French-language films
2010s road comedy-drama films
French road comedy-drama films
Films directed by Léa Fehner
2010s French films